The Poland national men's ice hockey team is the national ice hockey team of Poland, and a member of the International Ice Hockey Federation. They are ranked 21st in the world in the IIHF World Rankings, but prior to the 1980s they were ranked as high as 6th internationally. They are one of eight countries never to have played below the Division I (former B Pool) level. Currently the Polish national team plays at the Division IB level, the third tier of the World Championship.

Poland has competed in the Olympics thirteen times, most recently in 1992, with their best result being fourth place in 1932. They have been a regular participant of the World Championship, first appearing in 1930 and having appeared in all but one tournament since 1955. They frequently played in the top division, though have been in Division I since being relegated in 2002.

History

Poland was a regular participant of the early Winter Olympics, first competing at the 1928 Winter Olympics in St. Moritz, Switzerland, where they finished ninth out of eleven teams. They would appear at ever Winter Olympics until 1956, with their best finish being fourth in 1932.

Financed by state coal money from the 1950s to the 1970s the Polish hockey team was a regular at the top level upsetting the Swedes, Finns, and Czechoslovaks from time to time. They hosted the World Championship for the only time in 1976, with the matches taking place in Katowice. At this tournament Poland defeated the Soviet Union 6–4 in their opening match, the first time Poland ever won against the Soviets and what is regarded as one of the greatest upsets in international hockey history. While Poland finished seventh and was relegated for the following year, their victory against the USSR helped prevent them from winning gold for only the second time in 13 years.

In the Olympics earlier that year, Poland played 5 matches in the top division, but lost all of them. In the first game, the team managed four goals on the West Germany but it was not enough as they lost 7–4. Four days later, after being destroyed by the Soviet Union, the Poles took on Czechoslovakia who dominated the whole game throughout and won 7–1, but after the drug testing, the officials found that one of the Czech players tested positive for doping and they awarded Poland with a 1–0 victory, although they didn't receive any points in the standings. With only two games left and no points in the standings, Poland had no shot at a medal, but still played the last two games against the United States and Finland, and lost 7–2 and 7–1 respectively.

Poland managed to clean up a bit over four years and played well during the 1980 Olympics and finished seventh out of twelve teams. They managed to pull off a huge upset in their first game by beating Finland 5–4, who would eventually advance to the medal round. In their next game, they played Canada and hoped to complete an even bigger upset. The Canadians didn't let this happen and beat the Poles 5–1. In the third game, Poland took on the five time gold medalists, The Soviet Union. The players knew that this would be a challenge because they had played the Soviets many times before and had lost by usually very lopsided scores, such as 8–3, 9–3, 16–1, and 20–0. The Polish team, however, had also beaten the Soviets once in the 1976 World Championship and some of the players from that game were still on the team. The team tried to keep the Soviets down, but it was too much and the USSR stormed to an 8–1 win.

With their toughest games out of the way, Poland would have one more chance to try to get to the Medal Round. They took on the Netherlands and went down early in the first period but managed to tie it about four minutes later. The Dutch team scored twice more in the period to lead 3–1. Polish hero Wieslaw Jobczyk (who scored a hat trick in the 1976 upset against USSR) scored to put Poland within one goal but the Netherlands stormed back to get two more goals before the third period to make it 5–2. The Polish ended up losing 5–3 and saw their hopes of the Medal round come to an end. They had one more game against Japan, who had not won any games in the tournament and only tied once. Poland burst out in the first period and scored 3 goals before twenty minutes had ended. They scored two more goals and Japan seemed out of it. The final score was 5–1 for Poland. The team's final record was 2–3–0 and received 4 points in the standings.

When Communist rule ended in 1989, the Polish national team began a slow decline in international play. They reached the Olympics in 1992, the most recent time they have played there, and finished eleventh out of twelve teams. During the 1990s the first two Polish-born and trained players were selected in the NHL Entry Draft: Mariusz Czerkawski was selected in the 1991 by the Boston Bruins, and Krzysztof Oliwa in 1993 by the New Jersey Devils; Oliwa won the Stanley Cup with the Devils in 2000, the first and only Pole to do so.

Poland last competed at the Elite level in 2002 World Championship, where they finished fourteenth and were relegated. Since then they have remained in Division I, but have not earned promotion back to the top level, though they have finished just outside of promotion several times. They were relegated to Division IB in 2018, the lowest they had ever played at.

Tournament record

Olympic Games

World Championship

European Championships

Former Players In NHL
Players who have played in the NHL and the Polish national team

NHL Entry Draft
Polish born players selected in the NHL Entry Draft

Notable National team players
Henryk Gruth – Most games played for national team (292)
Andrzej Zabawa – Most goals scored (99)
Leszek Laszkiewicz – 216 games played, 150 total points

Other Polish-born NHL players
Nick Harbaruk – Pittsburgh Penguins, St. Louis Blues
Frank Jerwa – Boston Bruins, St. Louis Eagles
Joe Jerwa – New York Rangers, Boston Bruins, New York Americans
Edward Leier – Chicago Blackhawks
John Miszuk – Detroit Red Wings, Chicago Blackhawks, Philadelphia Flyers, Minnesota North Stars

Head-to-head records

 The head-to-head records do not include matches against reserve, junior teams or club teams.
 In grey, teams of countries which no longer exist

References

External links

IIHF profile
National Teams of Ice Hockey

Ice hockey in Poland
National ice hockey teams in Europe
Ice hockey